The Fender Stratocaster, colloquially known as the Strat, is a model of electric guitar designed from 1952 into 1954 by Leo Fender, Bill Carson, George Fullerton, and Freddie Tavares. The Fender Musical Instruments Corporation has continuously manufactured the Stratocaster since 1954. It is a double-cutaway guitar, with an extended top "horn" shape for balance. Along with the Gibson Les Paul, Gibson SG, and Fender Telecaster, it is one of the most-often emulated electric guitar shapes. "Stratocaster" and "Strat" are trademark terms belonging to Fender. Guitars that duplicate the Stratocaster by other manufacturers are sometimes called S-Type or ST-type guitars.

The guitar introduced into the popular market several features that were innovative for electric guitars in the mid-1950s. The distinctive body shape, which has become commonplace among electric guitars, was revolutionary for the time period, and for the first time a mass-market electric guitar did not significantly resemble earlier acoustic models. The double cutaway, elongated horns, and heavily contoured back were all designed for better balance and comfort to play while standing up and slung off the shoulder with a strap. The three-pickup design offered players increased versatility and choice in tone quality over earlier one- and two-pickup electric guitars, and a responsive and simplified vibrato arm integrated into the bridge plate, which marked a significant design improvement over other vibrato systems, such as those manufactured by Bigsby. All of these design elements were popularized and later became an industry standard due to the success of the Stratocaster. The Fender Stratocaster is one of the most iconic electric guitar models of all time.

Over the years, countless variations of the Stratocaster have been made. The modular nature of the guitar, with its easily removable components, left players and luthiers to perform numerous modifications to their own guitars, changing out pickups or necks to fit the needs of the player. Fender has released numerous models with different pickup configurations and has made other small modifications to the electronics and components of the base model, such as changing the initial 3-position selector switch to a standard 5-position selector switch, offering more tonal variety, as well as other small cosmetic changes to things like tuning pegs and types of woods used in various parts of the guitar. Various other companies have produced their own Strat-style bodies known as Superstrats.

Overall design
The archetypal Stratocaster is a solid-body electric guitar with a contoured asymmetric double-cutaway body with an extended upper horn; the body is usually made from alder or ash. The neck is usually made from maple and attached to the body with screws (often referred to as "bolts") and has a distinctive headstock with six tuning pegs mounted inline along a single side; the fingerboard may be maple or another wood, e.g. rosewood, and has at least twenty-one frets. 
The Stratocaster's body is front-routed for electronics, which are mounted in a plastic pickguard. Most Stratocasters have three single-coil pickups, a pickup selector switch, one volume control and two tone controls. Bridges generally come in two designs: the more common pivoting "tremolo" bridges, and the less common "hardtail" fixed bridge. Both types of bridge have six individually adjustable saddles whose height and intonation can be set independently. Early models of the stratocaster came with a removable metal cover plate that fit over the bridge. The plate was purely cosmetic, and tended to get in the way of important playing techniques such as palm muting, so many players removed it. By the late 1970s, Fender stopped shipping guitars with the bridge cover plate, though some more modern reissue and custom shop models still have them. The innovative tremolo system is balanced by springs mounted in a rear cavity. The output jack is mounted in a recess in the front of the guitar body. Many different colors have been available.

There have been some minor changes to the design over the years and models with features that differ from the archetypical design. However, the essential character of the design has remained constant.

History

1954–1984

The Stratocaster was the first Fender guitar to feature three pickups and a spring tension vibrato system, as well as being the first Fender with a contoured body. The Stratocaster's sleek, contoured body shape (officially referred to by Fender as the "Original Contour Body") differed from the flat, squared edge design of the Telecaster. The Stratocaster's double cutaways allowed players easier access to higher positions on the neck.

The first model offered for sale was the 1954 Fender Stratocaster. The design featured a solid, deeply contoured ash body, a 21-fret one-piece maple neck with black dot inlays, and Kluson SafeTi String post tuning machines. The color was originally a two-color, dark brown-to-golden yellow sunburst pattern, although custom color guitars were produced (An example is Eldon Shamblin's gold Stratocaster, dated 6/1954).

In 1956, Fender began using alder for sunburst and most custom-color Stratocaster bodies. Ash needed grain filler and sanding blocks for contour sanding, though it was still used on translucent blonde instruments.

In 1957, the neck shape took a more "V-shaped" feel with deeper body carves on the guitar a noted feature.

In 1959, Fender introduced a thick Brazilian rosewood fretboard to the Stratocaster, now colloquially referred to as a "slab-board". This thicker board lasted until 1962, when the fretboard was made with a thinner 'veneer' of Brazilian Rosewood. Nearly all of the 1960s models of the Stratocaster had a rosewood fretboard, and maple fretboards would not be re-introduced in large numbers until 1970.

In 1960, the available custom colors were standardized with a paint chip chart, many of which were Duco automobile lacquer colors from DuPont available at an additional 5% cost. Inter-departmental DuPont support research provided a flexible basecoat for their wood applications.

A single-ply, eight-screw hole white pickguard (changed to an 11-hole three-ply in late 1959) held all electronic components except the recessed jack plate, facilitating assembly.

The 1963 Fender Stratocaster shows an advancement in design from the 1950s models including a 'veneer' Brazilian rosewood board with Clay Dot inlays, a 3 tone sunburst finish on an Alder body and Kluson tuners.

To summarize, the specific features in the evolution of the Fender Stratocaster between 1954 and 1979 included:
 1954–1959, one piece maple necks (including fretboard);
 1954–1964, Spaghetti logo on the headstock;
 1954–1967, Kluson tuners;
 1954–1971, 4 bolt back plate at neck joint;
 1954–1977, three way pickup selector switch;
 1954–1982, 7.25 inch radius board with small frets by modern standards;
 1959–1962, thick Brazilian rosewood (Dalbergia nigra) fretboard known as a "slab-board";
 1962–1966, thin Brazilian rosewood fretboard known as a "veneer-board";
 1964–1967, gold "transition" logo on the headstock with small writing of the word "Stratocaster";
 1965–1981, headstock enlarged on the right hand side
 1966–1969, Indian rosewood or optional separate laminated "maple cap" fretboards;
 1968–1982, black CBS logo with larger printed "STRATOCASTER" on the headstock;
 1967–1982, Fender "F" Tuners;
 1971–1981, 3 bolt back plate with MicroTilt neck relief adjuster and "Bullet" truss rod nut;
 1977–present, five way pickup selector switch.

Despite being credited with inventing the most popular electric guitar in history, Leo Fender made very few alterations to the basic design of the Fender Stratocaster (and the Telecaster for that matter) up until 1965 when the company was sold to CBS Instruments. For example, the bridge cover on the Fender Stratocaster was often taken off by players and either disposed or kept in the case. Despite full knowledge of this, Leo Fender always provided the new Fender guitars with a bridge cover to prevent corrosion on the bridge parts.

After 1965, the Fender company, under the control of CBS Instruments, saw a drop in sales of the Fender Stratocaster to customers. The Fender Jazzmaster had been promoted as the flagship guitar in the Fender line. As such, the resurgence of the Fender Stratocaster is credited to the arrival of Jimi Hendrix in the late 1960s. His remarkable playing style and musical prowess led to a dramatic increase in sales and thrust the Stratocaster into musical history as the premier electric guitar. As they followed Jimi Hendrix's popularity on TV, CBS asked for the word Stratocaster on the headstock be made larger so that people could read the model name easily.

Between the years 1954 and 1979, nearly a quarter of the Fender Stratocasters manufactured were made in a single year, in 1979. The increased 1970s production levels saw a gradual departure from the high quality instruments of the 1960s and the introduction of Japanese manufacturers into the market.

Original Stratocasters were manufactured with five vibrato springs (three in late 1953 prototypes) attached to a milled inertia block and anchored to the back of the body. The novel mechanism pivots on a fulcrum design with a six screw bridge plate, allowing the whole set-up to "float" while transferring the strings energy directly into the body. Though advertised as "Tremolo" (a change in volume amplitude), vibrato is the correct term for pitch variation. In the floating position, players can move the bridge-mounted vibrato tremolo arm up or down to modulate the pitch of the notes being played. Hank Marvin, Jeff Beck and Ike Turner have used the Stratocaster's floating vibrato extensively in their playing.

As string gauges have changed, players have experimented with the number of springs (often four though Hendrix used five). As the average gauge has decreased over the years, modern Stratocasters are equipped with three springs as a stock option in order to counteract the reduced string tension. While the floating bridge has unique advantages for wavering pitch upwards (like Jeff Beck), the functionality of the "floating" has been widely accepted, yet disputed by some musicians. Leo Fender insisted it leave the factory floating (raised up in the back) while designer Freddie Tavares preferred it tightened flush for full bridge plate/body contact resonance. As the bridge floats, the instrument has a tendency to go out of tune during double-stop string bends. Many Stratocaster players opt to tighten the springs (or even increase the number of springs used) so that the bridge is firmly anchored against the guitar body: in this configuration, the vibrato arm can still be used to slacken the strings and therefore lower the pitch, but it cannot be used to raise the pitch (a configuration sometimes referred to as "dive-only").

Some players, such as Eric Clapton and Ronnie Wood, feel that the floating bridge has an excessive propensity to detune guitars. These guitarists inhibit the bridge's movement with a chunk of wood wedged between the bridge block and the inside cutout of the tremolo cavity, and by increasing the tension on the tremolo springs; these procedures lock the bridge in a fixed position. Some Stratocasters have a fixed bridge in place of the vibrato assembly; these are colloquially called "hard-tails". There is considerable debate about the effects on tone and sustain of the material used in the vibrato system's 'inertia bar' and many aftermarket versions are available.

The Stratocaster features three single coil pickups, with the output originally selected by a 3-way switch. Guitarists soon discovered that by positioning the switch in between the first and second position, both the bridge and middle pickups could be selected, and similarly, the middle and neck pickups could be selected between the 2nd and 3rd position. When two pickups are selected simultaneously, they are wired in parallel which leads to a slight drop in output as slightly more current is allowed to pass to the ground. However in newer guitars, since the middle pickup is almost always wired in reverse (and with its magnets having opposite polarity), this configuration creates a spaced humbucking pair, which significantly reduces 50/60 cycle hum. Fender introduced a five-way selector in 1977, making such pickup combinations more stable.

The "quacky" or "doinky" tone of the bridge and middle pickups in parallel, popularized by players such as Jimi Hendrix, Stevie Ray Vaughan, David Gilmour, Rory Gallagher, Mark Knopfler, Bob Dylan, Eric Johnson, Nile Rodgers, George Harrison, Scott Thurston, Ronnie Wood, John Mayer, Ed King, Eric Clapton as a solo artist, and Robert Cray, can be obtained by using the pickup selector in position 2; similarly the middle and neck pickups in parallel can be obtained in position 4.

This setting's characteristic tone is not caused by any electronic phenomenon—early Stratocasters used identical pickups for all positions. This "in between" tone is caused by phase cancellation due to the physical position of the pickups along the vibrating string. The neck and middle pickups are each wired to a tone control that incorporates a single, shared tone capacitor, whereas the bridge pickup, which is slanted towards the high strings for a more trebly sound, has no tone control for maximum brightness.

On many modern Stratocasters, the first tone control affects the neck pickup; the second tone control affects the middle and bridge pickups; on some Artist Series models (Eric Clapton and Buddy Guy signature guitars), the first tone control is a presence circuit that cuts or boosts treble and bass frequencies, affecting all the pickups; the second tone control is an active midrange booster that boosts the midrange frequencies up to 25 dB (12 dB on certain models) to produce a fatter humbucker-like sound.

Dick Dale was a prominent Stratocaster player who also collaborated with Leo Fender in developing the Fender Showman amplifier. In the early 1960s, the instrument was also championed by Hank Marvin, guitarist for the Shadows, a band that originally backed Cliff Richard and then produced instrumentals of its own. In December 1964, George Harrison and John Lennon acquired Stratocasters and used them for "Help!", and onwards through to "Let It Be". Harrison used it as his main guitar in the Beatles from 1965 to 1970, and throughout his solo career. The double unison guitar solo on "Nowhere Man", was played by Harrison and Lennon on their new Stratocasters.

After the introduction of the Fender Stratocaster Ultra series in 1989, ebony was officially selected as a fretboard material on some models (although several Elite Series Stratocasters manufactured in 1983/84 such as the Gold and Walnut were available with a stained ebony fretboard). In December 1965 the Stratocaster was given a broader headstock with altered decals to match the size of the Jazzmaster and the Jaguar.

1985–present

During the CBS era, particularly the 1970s, the perceived quality of Fender instruments fell. During this time, vintage instruments from the pre-CBS era became popular.

When the Fender company was bought from CBS by a group of investors and employees headed by Bill Schultz in 1985, manufacturing resumed its former high quality, and Fender was able to regain market share and brand reputation. Dan Smith, with the help of John Page, proceeded to work on a reissue of the most popular guitars of Leo Fender's era. They decided to manufacture two Vintage reissue Stratocaster models, the one-piece maple neck 1957 and a rosewood-fretboard 1962 along with the maple-neck 1952 Telecaster, the maple-neck 1957 and rosewood-fretboard 1962 Precision Basses, as well as the rosewood-fretboard "stacked knob" 1962 Jazz Bass. These first few years (1982–1984) of reissues, known as American Vintage Reissues, are now high-priced collector's items and considered as some of the finest to ever leave Fender's Fullerton plant, which closed its doors in late 1984.

Some early reissues from 1986 were crafted with leftover parts from the Fullerton factory. Fender released their first Stratocaster signature guitar for Eric Clapton in 1988.

A popular Fender Reissue Stratocaster was the '57 American Vintage Reissue. The company regarded 1957 as a benchmark year for the Strat. The original specifications were used, with three 57/62 pickups, aged pickup covers and knobs, a tinted 7.25" radius, 21 fret maple neck, an ashtray bridge cover, and three position switch (with five-position switch kit included). The colors included white blonde, two-color sunburst, black, ocean turquoise, surf green, and ice blue metallic. The '57 Vintage Reissue Stratocaster was discontinued in 2012.

As well as the vintage reissues, Fender launched an updated model in 1987: the American Standard Stratocaster. This was tailored to the demands of modern players, notably having a flatter fingerboard, a thinner neck profile and an improved tremolo system. This model line has been continuously improved and remained in production until late 2016. The model line received upgrades in 2000, when it was renamed as the American Series Stratocaster, and again in 2008, when the American Standard name was restored. In 2017, the American Standard Stratocaster was replaced by the American Professional Stratocaster, with narrow frets, a fatter 'deep C' neck profile and V-Mod pickups. Various other modern American-made Stratocasters have been produced. As of 2019, these include the more affordable American Performer Stratocaster (successor to the Highway One and American Special Stratocasters) and the more expensive American Ultra Stratocaster (successor to the American Elite Stratocaster).

Fender has also manufactured guitars in East Asia, notably Japan, and in Mexico, where the affordable Player (formerly Standard) series guitars are built. In addition to the Player series, Fender has also released the Player Plus series that features noiseless pickups, locking tuners, and a 12" radius.

Fender Strat Plus Series 
 
Fender has produced various 'deluxe' modern American Stratocasters with special features.

The Strat Plus was produced from 1987 to 1999 and was equipped with Lace Sensor pickups, a roller nut, locking tuners, a TBX tone control and a Hipshot tremsetter. The Strat Plus Deluxe was introduced in 1989 with pickup and tremolo variations. The Strat Ultra was introduced in 1990, again with pickup variations, and also with an ebony fingerboard.

Fender Custom Classic Series 
The Fender Custom Shop produced an entry level, team built Stratocaster that was discontinued in 2008. The Custom Classic Strat was intended to be a combination of the best aspects of vintage and modern Strats. The guitar boasted 3 Modern Classic pickups, with the bridge pickup being wound with copper wire and it was called the Hot Classic pickup. The bridge was a Custom Classic 2-point tremolo with pop-in tremolo bar. The "C" Shaped neck was maple with either maple or rosewood finger board and 22 jumbo frets. The colors available were three-color sunburst, daphne blue, black, bing cherry transparent, cobalt blue transparent, and honey blonde.

Signature models

Fender has released several models of Stratocaster in collaboration with famous guitarists. They include:

Jeff Beck
Eric Clapton
 Dick Dale
 Rory Gallagher
 Jimi Hendrix
 Richie Blackmore
 Yngwie Malmsteen
 Richie Sambora
 Bonnie Raitt
 Stevie Ray Vaughan
 H.E.R.
 Tom Morello

See also
 List of Stratocaster players
 Superstrat

Notes

References

Sources

External links

 
 The most expensive guitar  
 FUZZFACED Fender Stratocaster

01
Stratocaster
1954 musical instruments
Musical instruments invented in the 1950s
The Beatles' musical instruments
Goods manufactured in Mexico